Mitchell Murray (January 28, 1896 – August 12, 1940), sometimes listed as "Mitchell Murphy", was an American Negro league catcher between 1919 and 1932.

A native of Wyoming, Ohio, Murray made his Negro leagues debut in 1919 with the Dayton Marcos. He enjoyed a long career with several teams, including the St. Louis Stars and Chicago American Giants, and finished his career with the Indianapolis ABCs in 1931 and 1932. Murray died in Dayton, Ohio in 1940 at age 44.

References

External links
 and Baseball-Reference Black Baseball stats and Seamheads

1896 births
1940 deaths
Chicago American Giants players
Cleveland Tate Stars players
Dayton Marcos players
Indianapolis ABCs players
Indianapolis ABCs (1931–1933) players
St. Louis Stars (baseball) players
Toledo Tigers players
20th-century African-American sportspeople
Baseball catchers